The 2020 Puerto Rico Democratic presidential primary took place on July 12, 2020. The primary was scheduled to take place on Sunday, March 29, 2020, but Puerto Rican governor Wanda Vazquez postponed the date to April 26, 2020, amid concerns regarding the COVID-19 pandemic in Puerto Rico. The approved delay was signed by the Puerto Rican governor on March 21. It had then been postponed indefinitely until a date was chosen. The Puerto Rico primary is an open primary, with the territory awarding 59 delegates, of which 51 are pledged delegates allocated on the basis of the results of the primary.

Candidates
The following candidates will be on the ballot in Puerto Rico:

Running
Joe Biden

Withdrawn
Michael Bloomberg
Pete Buttigieg
Tulsi Gabbard
Amy Klobuchar
Bernie Sanders
Tom Steyer
Elizabeth Warren

Procedure

The Puerto Rico Democratic primary was originally scheduled for June 7, 2020, but on August 2, 2019, Governor Ricardo Rosselló signed a law that moved the date to the last Sunday in March (March 29). Due to concerns amid the 2020 coronavirus pandemic, the primary has been postponed to July 12, 2020.

In the open primary, candidates must meet a threshold of 15 percent at the senatorial district level or across the entire territory in order to be considered viable. The 51 pledged delegates to the 2020 Democratic National Convention will be allocated proportionally on the basis of the results of the primary. Of the 51 pledged delegates, between 4 and 5 are allocated to each of the territory's 8 senatorial districts and another 7 are allocated to party leaders and elected officials (PLEO delegates), in addition to 11 at-large pledged delegates. These delegate totals do not account for pledged delegate bonuses or penalties from timing or clustering.

On June 20, 2020, the state convention will vote on the 11 pledged at-large and 7 PLEO delegates to send to the Democratic National Convention. In addition, should presidential candidates be entitled to more delegates than delegate candidates presented, the additional delegates will be chosen at the state convention. The 51 pledged delegates Puerto Rico sends to the national convention will be joined by 8 unpledged PLEO delegates (7 members of the Democratic National Committee and the governor).

Results

References

Notes

External links
The Green Papers Democratic Party delegate allocation summary
Puerto Rico Democratic Party delegate selection plan

Democratic primaries
Puerto Rico
Puerto Rico Democratic primaries
Puerto Rico